Ptarmigan Lake is an alpine lake at the foot of Ptarmigan Peak. Several backcountry campgrounds are situated near the lake, as well as the Skoki Ski Lodge just over Deception Pass. The main access to the lake is a trail near the Lake Louise Mountain Resort. The lake drains into the Bow River via the Skoki Valley.

References

Lakes of Alberta
Banff National Park